Lee Chatametikool is a Thai film editor and sound editor. He is a frequent collaborator with Apichatpong Weerasethakul and other Thai independent directors, but has also worked on commercial films, including the hit Thai horror film, Shutter.

Lee studied filmmaking in the United States. He has been active since 1999, when he directed a short film, Miami Strips, Hollywood Dreams (Muang maya, krung tida). The film was the runner-up winner of the Rattana Pestonji Award for Best Thai Short Film at the 2000 Thai Short Film and Video Festival.

He has worked with Apichatpong Weerasethakul on five films: Blissfully Yours, Tropical Malady, Syndromes and a Century, Uncle Boonmee Who Can Recall His Past Lives and Memoria. At the inaugural Asian Film Awards in 2007 in Hong Kong, Lee won the Best Editor award for Syndromes and a Century.

In 2002, Lee founded his own post-production company, Houdini Studio.

Filmography

As director
 Miami Strips, Hollywood Dreams (Muang maya, krung tida, 1999)
 Concrete Clouds, ภวังค์รัก (2013)

As film editor
 Blissfully Yours (2002)
 One Night Husband (2003)
 Sayew (2003)
 Fake (2003)
 Tropical Malady (2004)
 Shutter (2004)
 Midnight My Love (2005)
 Ghost of Mae Nak (2005, contributing)
 The Elephant King (2006)
 Graceland (2006)
 Syndromes and a Century (2006)
 The Sperm (2007)
 Block B (2008)
 Karaoke (2009)
 Uncle Boonmee Who Can Recall His Past Lives (2010)
 Cemetery of Splendour (2015)Pop Aye (2017)
 Apprentice (2017)
 Manta Ray (2018)
 The Cave (2019)
 Vengeance Is Mine, All Others Pay Cash (2021)
 Yuni (2021)
Memoria (2021)

As sound editor
 Blissfully Yours (2002)
 One Night Husband (2003)
 Sayew (2003)
 Tropical Malady (2004)

As post-production supervisor
 Invisible Waves (2005)

External links
 Houdini Studio, Lee Chatametikool's post-production company
 
 Lee Chatametikool interview at YouTube from the 2007 Sarajevo Film Festival

Year of birth missing (living people)
Living people
Lee Chatametikool